Shepelevo is a rural locality (a village) in Vladimir, Vladimir Oblast, Russia. The population was 161 as of 2010. There are 2 streets.

Geography 
Shepelevo is located 14 km southeast of Vladimir. Nikulino is the nearest rural locality.

References 

Rural localities in Vladimir Urban Okrug